Mertzwiller is a commune in the Bas-Rhin department in Grand Est in north-eastern France.

Notable people
 Sam Marx, father of the Marx Brothers 
 Joseph-Paul Strebler, missionary and bishop in Togo

See also
 Communes of the Bas-Rhin department

References

Communes of Bas-Rhin
Bas-Rhin communes articles needing translation from French Wikipedia